Bichura (Beshüür) is a rural locality (selo) and the administrative center of Bichursky District of the Republic of Buryatia, Russia. Population:

Галерея

References

Notes

Sources

Rural localities in Bichursky District